This is a list of public art in Merthyr Tydfil in south Wales and includes works located in Merthyr Tydfil County Borough. This list applies only to works of public art on permanent display in an outdoor public space and does not, for example, include artworks in museums.

Bedlinog

Cefn-coed-y-cymmer

Dowlais

Merthyr Tydfil

Trelewis

Troed-y-rhiw

References

Merthyr Tydfil
Public art